Cynthia "Cindy" Schreyer (born January 21, 1963) is an American professional golfer who played on the LPGA Tour. She also competed as Cindy McCurdy from 1998 to 2000. Schreyer started playing golf at the age of 15.

Schreyer won several amateur tournaments including the NCAA Women's Division I Championship in 1984 and the U.S. Women's Amateur Public Links in 1986. She played on the U.S. Curtis Cup team in 1986.

While at the University of Georgia, she won the Broderick Award (now the Honda Sports Award) as the nation's best female collegiate golfer in 1984.

Schreyer played on the Futures Tour in 1987 and 1988, winning twice.

Schreyer played on the LPGA Tour from 1989 to 2004, winning once in 1993. In the three years from 1999 to 2001, Schreyer held positions on the LPGA Tour Player Executive Committee, including the Presidency (1999–2000).

Schreyer won $1,473,602 in prize money on the LPGA Tour over the course of her career.

Professional wins

LPGA Tour wins (1)

Futures Tour wins
1987 Ravines Classic
1988 LaGrange Honda Classic

Team appearances
Amateur
Curtis Cup (representing the United States): 1986

References

External links

American female golfers
Georgia Bulldogs women's golfers
LPGA Tour golfers
Golfers from Georgia (U.S. state)
Golfers from Connecticut
People from Forest Park, Georgia
Sportspeople from the Atlanta metropolitan area
People from New Fairfield, Connecticut
1963 births
Living people